The Cabinet of Turkey or Presidential Cabinet is the body that exercises supreme executive authority in Turkey. It is composed of the President and the heads of the ministries.

From 1923 to 2018, Ministers were ceremonially appointed by the President on the advice of the Prime Minister. From 2018, Turkey adopts an Executive Presidency meaning that the President has the full responsibility to appoint and relinquish Ministers from their duties. The cabinet is the executive power and is responsible for the management of the state.

Process of nomination and appointment 
The President of Turkey is elected by the people every five years. The president then appoints and dismiss the deputies of the president as well as the ministers according to article 104 of the Constitution. The deputies of the president and the ministers are required to take oath before the Parliament.

After the transition to a presidential system in 2017, the cabinet does not require a parliamentary approval anymore to be formed, and thus the number of technocrats in the cabinet has increased.

Separation of powers 
Cabinet members and other members of the executive power cannot occupy any position in the Parliament. Cabinet ministers, and other executive branch appointees, must resign their seat in Parliament to serve in the government. These restrictions are in place to alleviate external pressure and influence on ministers, and to enable them to focus on their governmental work.

The Parliament has no role in confirming presidential appointments for the cabinet. However, a majority vote in the Parliament can overturn a presidential decree. It can also table a motion requesting that the ministers to be investigated on allegations of perpetration of a crime regarding their duties. The Parliament also can dismiss the President (and thus the whole cabinet) by calling for early presidential elections. In order to achieve this, a three-fifth majority in the Parliament is required. In this case, both the presidential election as well as the parliamentary election shall be renewed.

Functioning 
The president is the chief executive leader. Therefore, the whole cabinet's tenure is linked to the president's tenure: The president's (and the cabinet's) term automatically ends, if a newly elected president sits for the first time, or if the president resigns or dies.

The President is responsible for guiding the cabinet and deciding its political direction. According to the principle of departmentalization, the cabinet ministers are free to carry out their duties independently within the boundaries set by the President's political directives. The Parliament may at any time ask the President to dismiss a minister or to appoint a new minister. The President also decides the scope of each minister's duties and can nominate ministers to lead a department and so called ministers for special affairs without an own department. The president can also lead a department himself.

The president's freedom to shape its cabinet is only limited by some constitutional provisions: The president has to appoint a Minister of Defence, a Minister of Internal Affairs, Minister of Foreign Affairs and a Minister of Justice and is implicitly forbidden to head one of these departments himself, as the constitution invests these ministers with some special powers. For example, the Minister of Justice is also the President of the Council of Judges and Prosecutors. If two ministers disagree on a particular point, the cabinet resolves the conflict by a majority vote or the President decides the case itselves. This often depends on the President's governing style.

The President may appoint one or more deputies after being elected, who may deputise for the President in their absence. If the President dies or is unwilling or unable to act as President, the Deputy President shall act as and exercise the powers of the President until the next President of the Republic is elected.

According to established practice, decisions on important security issues are made by the National Security Council, a government agency chaired by the President. Pursuant to its (classified) rules of procedure, its sessions are confidential.

Meetings of the cabinet 
The cabinet regularly meets bi-weekly every Monday afternoon. Depending on how busy the schedule is, it is sometimes held on Tuesdays as well. After the meetings, a press conference is held by the head of government or a government spokesperson. The meetings, from which minutes will be drawn up, may be deliberative and/or decision-making. The minutes will include, exclusively, the circumstances related to the time and place of its celebration, the list of attendees, the resolutions adopted and the reports presented. Therefore, the deliberations that the different members of the Government maintain, since these by law are of a secret nature, can not be collected.

The meetings of the cabinet are convened and chaired by the President though, in his absence, Deputy President take the responsibility to chair over the cabinet. Before the transition to the presidential system in 2017, the meetings were chaired by the Prime Minister. Occasionally, the cabinet was also chaired by the President who then attended the meetings solely on a consultative basis.

Location of cabinet meetings 
The cabinet meetings are held at the Presidential Complex, the official resident of the President and the headquarters of the government. Previously, the meetings were also held in the Çankaya Mansion and the prime minister's office.

Current cabinet 

The current and 66th cabinet of Turkey (Erdoğan IV) has been in office since 9 July 2018. It currently consists of the following ministers:

See also 
 List of cabinets of Turkey
 Government of Turkey

References

External links
President's website

 
Government of Turkey
Turkey, Cabinet